Asian Amateur Championships can refer to two things:
 Asian Amateur Boxing Championships
 Asia-Pacific Amateur Championship - golf tournament